Brca is a village in the municipality of Bar, Montenegro. This village is famous for Ratac Abbey and the Villa Brca, places known to many in Montenegro and the Bar Municipality.

Demographics
According to the 2015 census, its population was 278.

References

Populated places in Bar Municipality